The 2009 PDC Pro Tour was a series of non-televised darts tournaments organised by the Professional Darts Corporation (PDC). They consisted of Professional Dart Players Association (PDPA) Players Championships and UK Open Regional Finals.

Prize money

In addition, £400 per Pro Tour event was reserved for a nine-dart finish. Should this not be won in an event, it would be carried over to the next event, and so on until a nine-dart finish is achieved. Once the prize fund is won, it will revert to £400 for the next event.

Players Championships
(All matches – best of 11 legs)

Bobby Bourn Memorial Players Championship at The Dome Leisure Centre, Doncaster on January 10

Eddie Cox Memorial Players Championship at Victoria Stadium, Gibraltar on January 17

Stan James.com Players Championship at Victoria Stadium, Gibraltar on January 18

German Darts Classic at van der Valk Hotel, Gladbeck on February 28

PDPA Players Championship at van der Valk Hotel, Gladbeck on March 1

Scottish Players Championship 1 at Magnum Leisure Centre, Irvine on March 7

North-West Players Championship at Robin Park Tennis Centre, Wigan on March 14

Brentwood Players Championship at Brentwood Centre, Brentwood on March 21

Midlands Players Championship at the Ricoh Arena, Coventry on March 28

Nuland Players Championship 1 at van der Valk Hotel, Nuland on April 4

Nuland Players Championship 2 at van der Valk Hotel, Nuland on April 5

South-West Players Championship at Wellsprings Leisure Centre, Taunton on April 11

Derby Players Championship at the Moorway Centre, Derby on April 18

Welsh Players Championship at the Newport Centre, Newport on May 9

Players Championship 1 at the Barnsley Metrodome, Barnsley on June 13

Players Championship 2 at the Barnsley Metrodome, Barnsley on June 14

GDT Players Championship 1 at the Stadthalle Dinslaken, Dinslaken on June 20

GDT Players Championship 2 at the Stadthalle Dinslaken, Dinslaken on June 21

Las Vegas Players Championship at the Mandalay Bay Resort, Las Vegas, Nevada on June 30

Australian Open Players Championship at the Coogee Bay Hotel, Sydney on August 9

Canadian Players Championship at the Hilton, London, Ontario on August 16

Atlanta Players Championship at the Holiday Inn Select, Atlanta on August 22

US Open Players championship at the Holiday Inn Select, Atlanta on August 23

Austrian Open Players Championship 1 at the Renaissance Hotel, Salzburg on September 5

Austrian Open Players Championship 2 at the Renaissance Hotel, Salzburg on September 6

Irish Players Championship 1 at the Citywest Hotel, Dublin on October 3

Irish Players Championship 2 at the Citywest Hotel, Dublin on October 4

John McEvoy Gold Dart Classic at the National Event Centre, Killarney on October 18

Nuland Players Championship 3 at van der Valk Hotel, Nuland on October 24

Nuland Players Championship 4 at van der Valk Hotel, Nuland on October 25

Scottish Players Championship 2 at Magnum Leisure Centre, Irvine on November 7

Scottish Players Championship 3 at Magnum Leisure Centre, Irvine on November 8

UK Open Regional Finals
(All matches – best of 11 legs)

UK Open North-East Regional Final at The Dome Leisure Centre, Doncaster on January 11

UK Open Scottish Regional Final at Magnum Leisure Centre, Irvine on March 8

UK Open North-West Regional Final at Robin Park Tennis Centre, Wigan on March 15

UK Open South-East Regional Final at Brentwood Centre, Brentwood on March 22

UK Open West Midlands Regional Final at the Ricoh Arena, Coventry on March 29

UK Open South-West Regional at Wellsprings Leisure Centre, Taunton on April 12

UK Open East Midlands Regional at the Moorway Centre, Derby on April 19

UK Open Welsh Regional at the Newport Centre, Newport on May 10

German Darts Corporation

The German Darts Corporation rankings are calculated from events across Germany, Austria and Switzerland. The top player in the rankings automatically qualifies for the 2010 World Championship.

Australian Grand Prix Pro Tour

The Australian Grand Prix rankings are calculated from events across Australia. The top player in the rankings automatically qualifies for the 2010 World Championship.

Other PDC tournaments
The PDC also held a number of other tournaments during 2009. These were mainly smaller events with low prize money, and some had eligibility restrictions. All of these tournaments were non-ranking.

External links
2009 PDC Calendar

PDC Pro Tour
PDC Pro Tour